HMQS Mosquito was a torpedo boat operated by the Queensland Maritime Defence Force and Commonwealth Naval Forces. She entered service in 1885 and after Federation was transferred to the Commonwealth Naval Forces, serving as a training vessel until she was paid off in 1910.

Construction and design

Following the Jervois-Scratchley reports the colonial governments of Australia restructured their defence forces. One of the outcomes of the report was the formation of the Queensland Maritime Defence Force. To equip the new force two gunboats and a torpedo boat were initially purchased.

Constructed by Thornycroft of Chiswick, HMQS Mosquito was launched on 16 July 1884, having been before being completed in 1885. With a galvanised steel hull, she was designed with a top speed of 21 knots; however, was only able to achieve 17.21 knots during trials. The ship was built to a standard design; TB 191 of Tasmania and the New Zealand Defender-class torpedo boats were identical. Lonsdale and Nepean of Victoria, built in 1883–1884, were also identical, except in mounting fixed torpedo tubes. She had a complement of seven and was equipped with two sets of dropping gear for 14-inch torpedoes. Construction cost 3,500 pounds sterling.

Service history
Mosquito was subsequently transported to Australia as deck cargo by an East India Company steamer. She was subsequently based at facilities constructed at the bottom of the cliffs of the western side of Kangaroo Point, on the Brisbane River. She was never commissioned but simply placed into service when required, as she had no crew accommodation facilities, and therefore spent much of her time out of the water. Following Federation in 1901, Mosquito was transferred to the new Commonwealth Naval Forces and was employed as a training vessel until she was paid off in 1910. Her fittings and engines were removed before being abandoned in Boggy Creek near Pinkenba. Parts of her hull were discovered in January 1966 and an archaeological survey of the remains was conducted in 2009; the stern casemate was recovered and is in the collection of the Queensland Museum.

See also
 List of Queensland Maritime Defence Force ships
 Colonial navies of Australia – Queensland

Notes

References

 
 

 

Torpedo boats of the Queensland Maritime Defence Force
Torpedo boats of the Royal Australian Navy
1884 ships
Ships built in Chiswick